The works of the 17th-century mathematician Pierre de Fermat engendered many theorems. Fermat's theorem may refer to one of the following theorems:

 Fermat's Last Theorem, about integer solutions to an + bn = cn
 Fermat's little theorem, a property of prime numbers
 Fermat's theorem on sums of two squares, about primes expressible as a sum of squares
 Fermat's theorem (stationary points), about local maxima and minima of differentiable functions
 Fermat's principle, about the path taken by a ray of light
 Fermat polygonal number theorem, about expressing integers as a sum of polygonal numbers
 Fermat's right triangle theorem, about squares not being expressible as the difference of two fourth powers

See also
 List of things named after Pierre de Fermat

Set index articles on mathematics